Peace Arch Entertainment ("PAE") (formerly known as Medco from 1981 until 1985 and  Vidatron Entertainment from 1985 until 1999) was a Canadian motion picture and television production company based in Toronto, Ontario, Canada with offices in Los Angeles and Vancouver. The company produced and acquired feature films and television programs for worldwide distribution.

History 
Founded in 1981 as a home entertainment distributor, Peace Arch Entertainment got its name from the famous Peace Arch monument located on the Canada–US border near Blaine, Washington. Much like the monument represents an "open door" policy between the United States and Canada, PAE sought to promote the same form of unity within the company.

It was originally known as Medco, before renaming it in 1985, to Vidatron Entertainment, and the company went public. In 1997, the company had bought out Sugar Entertainment. In 1999, it was then renamed to Peace Arch Entertainment, and continues to develop their own projects.
In 2006, Peace Arch announced that it would acquire children's home video distributor Kaboom! Entertainment for $8.5 million. In 2007, Peace Arch announced that it would acquire Los Angeles-based home video distributor Trinity Home Entertainment. In 2009, Peace Arch's home video division and its subsidiary Kaboom! Entertainment was spun-off to form Phase 4 Films, a company founded by Berry Meyerowitz and was later acquired by Entertainment One in 2014. Peace Arch Entertainment filed for bankruptcy on May 16, 2013.

Filmography 

The Infidel (2010)
Flick (2010)
Kandahar Break (2010)
Who Killed Nancy? (2010)
What We Do Is Secret (2007)
JCVD (2008)
305 (2008)
Winged Creatures (2008)
Delirious (2006)
The Keeper (2004)

Television series 
The Immortal (2000)
Big Sound (2000-2001)
Animal Miracles (2001-2003)

References

External links 
Official Site DEAD LINK
Wikinvest - Peace Arch Entertainment Group (PAE)

Film production companies of Canada
Film distributors of Canada
Canadian companies established in 1981
Entertainment companies established in 1981
Canadian companies disestablished in 2013
Entertainment companies disestablished in 2013